Autodesk Vault is a data management tool integrated with Autodesk Inventor Series, Autodesk Inventor Professional, AutoCAD Mechanical, AutoCAD Electrical, Autodesk Revit and Civil 3D products. It helps design teams track work in progress and maintain version control in multi-user environments. It allows them to organize and reuse designs by consolidating product information and reducing the need to re-create designs from scratch. Users can store and search both CAD data (such as Autodesk Inventor, DWG, and DWF files) and non-CAD documents (such as Microsoft Word and Microsoft Excel files).

Overview 

The Vault environment functions as a client server application with the central SQL database and Autodesk Data Management Server (ADMS) applications installed on a Windows-based server with client access granted via various clients such as: Thick Client (Vault Explorer) and Application Integrations. ADMS acts as the middleware that handles client transactions with the SQL database. Vault Explorer functions as the client application and is intended to run alongside the companion CAD software. The Vault Explorer UI (User Interface) is intended to have an appearance similar to Microsoft Outlook and can display the Vault folder structure, file metadata in the form of a grid and a preview pane for more detailed information.

Autodesk Vault is a file versioning system that "records" the progression of all edits a file has undergone. All files and their associated metadata are indexed in the SQL base data management system and are searchable from the Vault client interface. Other information about the files include version history, uses (composed of a list of children), "Where Used" (a list of all parents) as well as a light weight viewable in the form of the Autodesk Design Web Format (DWF) file which is automatically published upon check-in. When users intend to edit a file the file is checked-out and edits are made. When the user is satisfied with the changes the file checked-in and new file version, containing the new changes, is then available to other users in the workgroup. In-process file changes (file saves) are hidden from other users until the changes are checked-in. As files are edited, renamed and moved in the folder structure the Vault database automatically updates any file references in related files.

Vault is intended to be the core data management strategy for Autodesk's design products and therefore has add-ins to many of Autodesk's design solutions.

ADMS also plays another role as the hosts for Autodesk Inventor's Content Center (Standard Parts Library) for use by Inventor when it's desired that they are hosted in a central location.

The Autodesk Vault Family of Products 

The Autodesk Vault product family is a stack of products each offering incremental functionality over the previous product.  While the base "Autodesk Vault" is included with many Autodesk design applications; additional functionality is available based on the needs of the organization.  The following products are part of the Autodesk Vault Family.

 Vault - Work-in-Process Data Management
 Vault Workgroup - Customisation, Revision Management & Security
 Vault Professional - Professional Level Capabilities such as ERP Integration, Item Master and more

Note: For the 2011 Release, Autodesk Vault Manufacturing was Renamed to Autodesk Vault Professional.  This was also formerly known as Autodesk Productstream in prior releases.  The family was subsequently simplified for the 2014 Release with the retirement of Autodesk Vault Collaboration

Functionality Matrix 

Legend
 V - Vault (Base)
 VW - Vault Workgroup
 VP - Vault Professional

History 

Autodesk Vault was initially known as truEVault; part of an acquisition from a company called truEInnovations, Inc. based in Eagan, Minnesota.  truEInnovations was started by two entrepreneurs, Brian Roepke and Dean Brisson in 1999.  The company was founded on the basis of bringing a more affordable tool for managing engineering data to the market.

After the asset acquisition of truEInnovations by Autodesk in 2003, Autodesk began to further the integration of the product into the manufacturing product line, starting with Autodesk Inventor.

Supported Applications 
As of the 2015 release, the following applications are supported by Autodesk Vault.

* These integrations are only available for Vault Workgroup and above.  Not the base Vault

Software Timeline

References

External links 
Autodesk Vault Family

Vault
Version control systems
Vault
Data management software